CSM Ploiești is a women's handball club from Ploieşti, Romania, that plays in the Liga Națională.

Kits

European record

References

External links
   
 

Romanian handball clubs
Ploiești (women's handball)
Sport in Ploiești
Handball clubs established in 2004
2004 establishments in Romania